The 2020 Sultan Azlan Shah Cup was scheduled to be the 29th edition of the Sultan Azlan Shah Cup, the annual men's international invitational field hockey tournament in Malaysia. It was scheduled to be held in April 2020 at the Azlan Shah Stadium in Ipoh, Malaysia. Following the COVID-19 pandemic the tournament was postponed to be held from 24 September to 3 October 2020. On 2 May 2020 the tournament was officially cancelled.

Teams
Pakistan were the first team to confirm their participation in the tournament. The other teams were announced on 20 January 2020.

References

2020
2020 in field hockey
2020 in Malaysian sport
Sultan Azlan Shah Cup